The 2012 NCAA Division II men's basketball tournament involved 64 schools playing in a single-elimination tournament to determine the national champion of men's NCAA Division II college basketball as a culmination of the 2011–12 basketball season. 

The Western Washington Vikings won the tournament to earn the first basketball national championship in school history.

Qualification and tournament format
The champions of 22 of the 23 Division II basketball conferences qualified automatically. An additional 42 teams were selected as at-large participants by the selection committee. The first three rounds of the tournament were organized in regions comprising eight participants in groups of two or three conferences (two in the Central and Midwest regions).  The eight regional winners met at the Elite Eight for the final three rounds held at The Bank of Kentucky Center, now known as BB&T Arena, on the campus of Northern Kentucky University in Highland Heights, Kentucky, after the final rounds were held in Springfield, Massachusetts for the previous six years.

Automatic qualifiers
The following teams automatically qualified for the tournament as the winners of their conference tournament championships: The newly formed Great American Conference began play for the 2011–12 season, composed of former members of the Lone Star Conference and Gulf South Conference. The conference champion, Arkansas Tech, was not eligible for an automatic berth, but did receive an at-large No. 3 seed in the South Central Region.

Qualified teams

Teams per conference
GLVC: 6
NSIC: 5
GNAC, NE-10, Sunshine State, WVIAC: 4
Gulf South, Lone Star, MIAA, Peach Belt, RMAC, SAC: 3
CCAA, CACC, CIAA, Conference Carolinas, ECC, GLIAC, Pacific West, PSAC: 2
GAC, Heartland, SIAC: 1

Regionals

East - Rindge, New Hampshire
Location: Franklin Pierce Fieldhouse Host: Franklin Pierce University

Atlantic - West Liberty, West Virginia
Location: Academic, Sports, and Recreation Complex Host: West Liberty University

South Central - Wichita Falls, Texas
Location: Gerald Stockton Court Host: Midwestern State University

West - Bellingham, Washington
Location: Sam Carver Gymnasium Host: Western Washington University

South - Huntsville, Alabama
Location: Spragins Hall Host: University of Alabama in Huntsville

Midwest - Louisville, Kentucky
Location: Knights Hall Host: Bellarmine University

Central - Golden, Colorado
Location: Steinhauer Field House Host: Colorado School of Mines

Southeast - Montevallo, Alabama
Location: People's Bank and Trust Arena Host: University of Montevallo

Elite Eight – Highland Heights, Kentucky 
Location: The Bank of Kentucky Center Host: Northern Kentucky University

All-tournament team
 Rory Blanche (Western Washington)
 Antoine Davis (Montevallo)
 Chris Dowe (Bellarmine)
 D.J. Rivera (Montevallo)
 Richard Woodworth (Western Washington)

References
 2012 NCAA Division II men's basketball tournament jonfmorse.com

NCAA Division II men's basketball tournament
Tournament
Basketball in Wichita Falls, Texas
NCAA Division II basketball tournament
NCAA Division II basketball tournament